X Japan Returns 1993.12.30 is an X Japan live DVD, released on February 29, 2008. It contains the band's performance at the Tokyo Dome on December 30, 1993. A DVD containing the concert from the following night (X Japan Returns 1993.12.31) was released on the same day, along with a limited edition containing both concerts and additional material (see X Japan Returns Complete Edition).

Track listing
Disc one
 "Prologue (~ World Anthem) (S.E.)"
 "Silent Jealousy"
 "Sadistic Desire"
 "Standing Sex"
 "Week End"
 "Heath Solo"
 "Yoshiki Drum Solo"
 "hide no Heya"

Disc two
 "Yoshiki Piano Solo"
 "Art of Life"
 "Celebration"
 "Orgasm"

Disc three
 "Tears"
 "Kurenai"
 "X"
 "Endless Rain"
 "Say Anything (S.E.)"

References

External links
X Japan Returns TV commercial

X Japan video albums
X Japan live albums
2008 video albums
Live video albums
2008 live albums